A Collection of Pop Classics is an album by American hardcore punk band Reagan Youth. It was released after the break-up of the band in 1989 and the suicide of lead singer Dave Rubinstein in 1993. The record is a compilation of the band's two studio albums, Volume 1 and Volume 2.

Track listing 
Source: Last.fm, Allmusic

Personnel 
 Dave Rubinstein – vocals (all tracks)
 Paul Bakija – guitar (all tracks); bass (tracks 11–22)
 Al Pike – bass (tracks 1–10)
 Steve Weinstein – drums (tracks 1–10)
 Javier Madriaga – drums (tracks 11–22)

References 

Reagan Youth albums
1994 compilation albums
New Red Archives albums